Melitius or Meletius (died 327) was bishop of Lycopolis in Egypt. He is known mainly as the founder and namesake of the Melitians (c. 305), one of several schismatic sects in early church history which were concerned about the ease with which lapsed Christians reentered the Church.

The details of his life are not clear as there are conflicting accounts of it. According to one version he was imprisoned for his Christianity during the persecution under Diocletian along with Peter of Alexandria. Another source has Peter fleeing the scene and a third one has Melitius himself avoiding prison. Apparently, as early as during the persecution itself, Melitius began to refuse to accept in communion those Christians who had renounced their faith during the persecution and later repented of that choice. Melitius' rigorous stance on this point stood in contrast to the earlier willingness of bishops to accept back into communion those who seemed to have truly repented (a pattern which was addressed during previous similar controversies, including those who had lapsed during the Decian persecution about 50 years earlier).

As Bishop of Alexandria, Peter would have been recognized as the leader of the Egyptian church and thus Melitius's superior in church hierarchy. Historian Philip Schaff tells us that prior to Peter's death in 311, he spoke out against Melitius's actions and "deposed him as a disturber of the peace of the church".

The supporters that Melitius drew around him included twenty-eight other bishops, at least some of whom he personally ordained, and the objections against him included that he ordained people in regions where he lacked authority. His group went by the name Church of the Martyrs, inherently objecting to the reacceptance by other bishops of people who chose to avoid the risk of martyrdom. Melitius' influence extended into Palestine.

It is believed by some that Melitius ordained Arius, known for the Arian controversy, as a priest. Scholarly opinions are divided on whether this is the case.

The Council of Nicaea in 325 attempted to create peace with the Melitians. Melitius was allowed to remain bishop of Lycopolis, but was no longer to ordain bishops outside his region. The bishops he had already ordained were accepted under certain restrictions, and had to be reordained. Melitius's death followed in 327, and he was succeeded as leader by his handpicked successor, John Arkhaph. The effort to bring unity proved unsuccessful. His followers sided with the Arians in their controversy and existed as a separate sect until the fifth century.

References

4th-century Egyptian bishops
Ancient Christians involved in controversies
Schisms in Christianity
327 deaths